Cynometra alexandri, the Uganda ironwood or muhimbi, is a species of legume that occurs in tropical lowland forests of central and east Africa. They grow gregariously in drier forest types and as a constituent of swamp forests.

Taxonomy

Distribution and habitat
In Uganda it is widespread in the lowland forests (below 2,000 metres a.s.l) in the Western Rift Escarpment, where it shows a tendency toward monospecific dominance. After initial colonising, a mixed forest would contain Uganda ironwood, Alstonia congensis, Trichilia prieuriana, Khaya anthotheca and Celtis mildbraedii. When climax forest develops at altitudes between 1,000 and 1,200 m, Uganda ironwood becomes highly dominant. Though a common species, its range has been reduced by wood cutting, large scale farming and subsistence cultivation.

Uses
The durable and dull, reddish brown heartwood is resistant to termite damage or abrasion, while the greyish sapwood is permeable to preservatives. It is employed in industrial or heavy-duty flooring, besides construction, marine work and for railway sleepers.

Due to its physical properties, such as bending strength, inter-node distance, and leaf surface area, the Muhimbi is favoured by chimpanzees for their daily construction of sleeping platforms or "nests".

References

alexandri
Flora of Africa